The 2004 Tour de Pologne was the 61st edition of the Tour de Pologne cycle race and was held from 6 September to 12 September 2004. The race started in Gdańsk and finished in Karpacz on a route similar to that of the previous edition. The race was won by Ondřej Sosenka.

General classification

References

2004
Tour de Pologne
Tour de Pologne